Super Friends is an American animated television series about a team of superheroes, which ran from 1973 to 1985 on ABC as part of its Saturday-morning cartoon lineup. It was produced by Hanna-Barbera and was based on the Justice League of America and associated comic book characters published by DC Comics.

The name of the program (and the Justice League members featured with the Super Friends) has been variously represented (as Super Friends and Challenge of the Superfriends, for example) at different points in its broadcast history. There were a total of 93 episodes and two backdoor-pilot episodes of The New Scooby-Doo Movies, with Batman and Robin appearing in "The Dynamic Scooby-Doo Affair" and "The Caped Crusader Caper".

Series titles
Over the years, the show existed under several titles:
 Super Friends (1973–1974)
 The All-New Super Friends Hour (1977–1978)
 Challenge of the Superfriends (1978–1979)
 The World's Greatest SuperFriends (1979–1980)
 SuperFriends (1980–1983)
 SuperFriends: The Legendary Super Powers Show (1984–1985)
 The Super Powers Team: Galactic Guardians (1985–1986)

Writing
Plot lines for the later series involved many of the familiar DC Comics super-villains that the first incarnation of the Super Friends did not. Instead, like the comic books, they focused on the far-fetched schemes of mad scientists and aliens, who were invariably revealed as being well-intentioned, and simply pursuing their goals through unlawful or disreputable means. Typically, at the end of each story, a peaceful and reasonable discussion would be performed by the heroes to convince the antagonists to adopt more reasonable methods.

The All-New Super Friends Hour departed somewhat from the previous series' formula by featuring villains using more elaborate methods to further their goals; as a rule they could not be reasoned with, requiring the heroes to use direct force to stop them. Beginning with Challenge of the Superfriends, several of the heroes' arch-villains from the comic books (such as Lex Luthor and The Riddler) began to feature prominently in comic-style stories. Throughout the series, plots often wrapped themselves up neatly in the final minutes of an episode in the fashion of the typical comic books and deus ex machina.

Production history
In 1973, the American Broadcasting Company (ABC) acquired rights to the DC Comics characters and partnered with animation company Hanna-Barbera to adapt the Justice League of America comic book for television. The network made several changes in the transition, including the change of name to Super Friends, to "cut off any accusations of extreme patriotism". Nevertheless, team members sometimes referred to themselves as the Justice League on the show. The violence common in superhero comics was toned down for a younger audience and to adhere to broadcast standards governing violence in 1970s children's television.

As a DC Comics-based show, the Super Friends franchise was owned by DC's parent company Warner Bros., who later put the series into syndication. Cartoon Network, which had the rights to air most of the rest of the Hanna-Barbera library from its inception in 1992, was not able to air Super Friends until after the merger of Warner Bros.' parent company, Time Warner and Cartoon Network's parent company, Turner Broadcasting System was completed in 1996. This merger also led to Warner Bros. taking control of Hanna-Barbera and all of its other assets as well. The series was owned by Hanna-Barbera Cartoons, DC Comics Entertainment, Warner Bros. Family Entertainment, and Warner Bros. Animation.

1973–1974 series

Super Friends first aired on ABC on September 8, 1973, featuring well-known DC characters Superman, Batman and Robin, Wonder Woman, and Aquaman. Superman, Batman and Robin, and Aquaman had each previously appeared in their own animated series produced by Filmation, and voice talent from these prior programs was brought in to work on the new show (with the exception of Marvin Miller who was replaced by Norman Alden as the voice of Aquaman). Shortly before the Super Friends series was developed, Superman and Wonder Woman also guest-starred in two episodes of The Brady Kids (voiced by Lennie Weinrib and Jane Webb under Filmation), while Batman and Robin appeared in two episodes of The New Scooby-Doo Movies.

In addition to the superheroes, a trio of sidekicks was introduced, each of whom were new characters not drawn from the comic books: Wendy and Marvin (voiced by Sherri Alberoni and Frank Welker) and Wonder Dog (also voiced by Frank Welker), none of whom had any special abilities (save the dog's unexplained ability to reason and talk). The trio—or at least its human members—were depicted as detectives and/or superheroes-in-training; the "teen detectives and their talking animal" cliché, originally popularized by  Scooby-Doo, was typical in Hanna-Barbera cartoons of the mid/late 1970s.

Each episode began with the heroes responding to an emergency detected by the massive TroubAlert computer in the Hall of Justice, which served as the headquarters of the team. Colonel Wilcox, a U.S. Army official, was a recurring character who would act as a government liaison with the Super Friends during emergencies. Colonel Wilcox was voiced by John Stephenson.
Conflicts were usually resolved with the antagonists persuaded to adapt more reasonable methods to achieve their aims (with the assistance of the heroes). Natural disasters triggered by human (or alien) activity were often shown, and environmental themes featured strongly in the program. Three other DC Comics superheroes were featured as guest stars during this season: the Flash, Plastic Man, and Green Arrow.

This first run of Super Friends, consisting of 16 one-hour episodes which were rerun several times, concluded on August 24, 1974. At this point, the series was cancelled. However, interest in superheroes among ABC's prime-time viewers (with the success of The Six Million Dollar Man and the live-action Wonder Woman series) caused the network to revive Super Friends. The original 16 episodes of the series were rebroadcast as a mid-season replacement, running from February 7, 1976, to September 3, 1977. These episodes were edited into half-hour versions. At the same time, DC Comics published a Super Friends comic, which used Wendy and Marvin from issue #1 (November 1976) to #6 (August 1977). In the meantime, Hanna-Barbera began production on a revamped version of the show.

1977–1978 season: The All-New Super Friends Hour

The All-New Super Friends Hour featured four animated shorts per program. Wendy, Marvin, and Wonder Dog were dropped from this and all future TV iterations of Super Friends, and were replaced by Wonder Twins Zan and Jayna, and their pet monkey, Gleek. Unlike Wendy and Marvin, Zan and Jayna had actual super powers. A total of 15 episodes were produced. Darrell McNeil of the Hanna-Barbera animation studios later explained the change in cast: 

The show followed a basic format each week. The first segment of every show featured two of the heroes (for the purposes of the team-ups in the first and fourth segments, Batman and Robin were considered "one hero") teaming up in a separate mini-story. The second segment featured a story with the Wonder Twins. The third segment was considered the "primary" adventure of the week, featuring the entire Super Friends roster (including the Wonder Twins) in a longer adventure. The fourth and final segment featured a story with one of the primary lineup and a "special guest star". This segment typically featured a problem that was solved using the guest star's unique abilities.

Between segments there were short spots with members of the Super Friends giving basic safety lessons, providing first-aid advice, demonstrating magic tricks, creating crafts, and presenting a two-part riddle featuring the week's primary plot line. This was the first season to feature two villains appearing in the comic books, Black Manta and Gentleman Ghost. Each appeared in only one episode this season and each was somewhat modified for television. Black Manta's costume was not black and he was only referred to as "Manta". The Gentleman Ghost was referred to as "Gentleman Jim Craddock" which is his human name in the comics.

1978–1979 season Super Friends / Challenge of the Superfriends

The next season of Super Friends featured two segments:

First segment: Super Friends episodes
The first segment of the program featured the established group of heroes: Superman, Batman and Robin, Aquaman, Wonder Woman, and the Wonder Twins and Gleek. They were rerun with intro from the All-New Super Friends Hour when in syndication in the early 1980s, but they are seldom seen in syndication since then.

Second segment: Challenge of the Superfriends
The second half-hour of the show introduced the Legion of Doom, a team of 13 recurring foes who are the Super Friends' worst enemies. They used a swamp-based mechanical flying headquarters, the Hall of Doom (resembling the helmet of Darth Vader), as a contrast to the Super Friends' gleaming Hall of Justice. A total of 16 episodes were produced.

Additional heroes who had previously appeared as guest stars were added to the roster as well, to make a total of 11. These included The Flash, Green Lantern, and Hawkman from DC Comics and three Hanna-Barbera creations: Black Vulcan, Apache Chief, and Samurai. Despite the Riddler showing a set of playing cards with (from left to right) Gleek, Zan, Aquaman, Wonder Woman, Robin, Batman, and Superman (which he then burns to ashes in his introduction in "Wanted: The Super Friends"), the Wonder Twins and Gleek did not appear in Challenge.

The Challenge of the Superfriends segment was expanded to 90 minutes mid-season, with reruns of earlier episodes filling out the last half-hour.

1979–1980 season: The World's Greatest SuperFriends

In the fall of 1979, the Super Friends returned to their prior format, bringing back the original set of five DC superheroes and Zan, Jayna, and Gleek. Eight half-hour episodes were created for this run, with the majority of the season consisting of repeats of The All-New Super Friends Hour from 1977 to 1978 and The Super Friends segments from Challenge of the Superfriends from 1978 to 1979. Renamed The World's Greatest SuperFriends, this series began on September 22, 1979, and ran until September 27, 1980.

1980–1982 seasons: SuperFriends

Renamed SuperFriends in 1980, the series changed formats again, abandoning the production of half-hour episodes and producing seven-minute shorts. Each episode of SuperFriends would feature a rerun from one of the previous six years and three new shorts. These new adventures featured appearances by the core group of five Super Friends and Zan, Jayna, & Gleek. There were also guest appearances from members previously depicted in Challenge of the Superfriends and the Hanna-Barbera-created hero El Dorado, who was added to the show in 1981 to provide cultural diversity.

This would prove to be one of the longer-lived incarnations of the series (three years). A total of 22 episodes were produced.

1982–1983 season: The Best of the Super Friends (reruns)
For the 1982–1983 television season ABC ran half-hour reruns of shows from the previous seven seasons, with none of the seven-minute shorts rebroadcast. ABC called the rerun package The Best of the Super Friends.

1983–1984 season: Cancellation and the "lost episodes"
Hanna-Barbera and Warner Bros. had created a syndication package of the earlier Super Friends series (co-distributed by LBS Communications); these were picked up by stations across the United States and typically broadcast on weekday afternoons. Not wishing to compete with the syndication programming, ABC dropped the series from the 1983–1984 Saturday morning television line-up. For the second time, Super Friends was cancelled.

However, during this time Hanna-Barbera continued to produce new episodes with the Super Friends, with ABC's approval and funding. In total, 24 "lost episodes" were produced, but not aired in the United States that season; the series appeared in Australia. Three of these episodes were aired when Super Friends returned to Saturday-morning ABC television the following year. The remainder aired on the USA Network in 1995, as part of the Superman/Batman Adventures show. The 1983 Lost Episodes of Super Friends were released on DVD by Warner Home Entertainment (via DC Comics Entertainment, Hanna-Barbera Cartoons, and Warner Bros. Family Entertainment) in April 2009.

1984–1985 season: SuperFriends: The Legendary Super Powers Show

Super Friends returned to ABC Saturday, September 8, 1984, with a new 30-minute program typically featuring two 11-minute stories per episode. This incarnation featured Superman, Batman, Robin, Wonder Woman, and the Wonder Twins and Gleek, this time teamed up with Firestorm. In addition to this core group, episodes during this season also featured cameos by old (and new) Super Friends. The series ended August 31, 1985, and featured comic-book villains such as Brainiac, Lex Luthor, Mirror Master, Mr. Mxyzptlk, Darkseid, and his henchmen from Apokolips. This season and the next featured the "Super Powers" tagline, which was part of a marketing tie-in with a toy line of the same name produced by Kenner.

1985–1986 season: The Super Powers Team: Galactic Guardians

In fall 1985, the next version of Hanna-Barbera's depiction of the DC Comics heroes began, although it no longer carried the Super Friends name. This series returned to a conventional lineup for the team, with a focus on teen members Cyborg and Firestorm. Once again headquartered at the Hall of Justice in Metropolis, the heroes battled such familiar foes as Lex Luthor, Brainiac, the Scarecrow, and recurring villain Darkseid. It also contained the only appearances by The Joker, The Penguin, the Royal Flush Gang, and Felix Faust.

Most notably, it is in this series that Batman's origin is depicted for the first time outside of comics and the first cartoon series. Batman and Robin chase The Scarecrow into Crime Alley, where Thomas and Martha Wayne were murdered, which triggers a fear-induced flashback. Additionally, in the same episode, Professor Jonathan Crane appears as the Scarecrow's secret identity, which was unknown to the authorities, allowing Scarecrow to use it to secretly sabotage the Super Friends' investigations until Batman managed to deduce his identity, leading to his arrest.

The Super Powers Team: Galactic Guardians lasted one season before being canceled. The final new episode aired was "Escape From Space City" on October 26, 1985. This third cancellation would be the final one, and Galactic Guardians marked the end of Hanna-Barbera's 13-year run of the series on October 26, 1985.

Characters

The Justice League of America
The core group of five heroes made up the "Super Friends":

Additional Justice League members included:
 The Atom (1977; 1980–1983)
 Firestorm (1984–1985)
 The Flash (1973; 1977–1985)
 Green Lantern (1977–1985)
 Hawkgirl (1977; 1980; 1983)
 Hawkman (1977–1978; 1980–1985)
 Cyborg (1985)
 Rima the Jungle Girl (1977; 1980) (not featured in DC superhero comics)

Justice League members created for the series:
 Apache Chief (1977–1978; 1980–1984)
 Black Vulcan (1977–1978; 1980–1984)
 El Dorado (1982–1985)
 Samurai (1977–1978; 1980–1985)

One-shot Justice League appearances were made by:
 Abin Sur (1978)
 Green Arrow (1973–1974)
 Plastic Man (1973–1974)
 Superboy (1978; 1983)

The teen sidekicks and their pets:
 Pets:
 Gleek (1977–1984)
 Wonder Dog (1973–1975)
 Wendy and Marvin:
 Wendy Harris (1973–1975)
 Marvin White (1973–1975)
 Wonder Twins:
 Jayna (1977–1984)
 Zan (1977–1984)

Other DC comic characters that appeared in the series:
 Commissioner James Gordon
 Hippolyta
 Lois Lane
 Jimmy Olsen
 Alfred Pennyworth
 Solovar (ruler of Gorilla City)
 Steve Trevor

Legion of Doom
Thirteen villains composed the Legion of Doom during the Challenge of the Superfriends season. They were:

Other DC Comics villains
Villains appearing independently from the Legion of Doom:

Villains appearing not adapted from the comic books:
 The Alien Mummy
 The Anti-Matter Monster
 Barko
 Bigfoot creatures
 Blackbeard
 Bulgor the Behemoth
 The Brain Creatures
 The Capricorn Kid
 Captain Shark
 The Collector
 The Incredible Crude Oil Monster
 Darkon
 Dictor and the mysterious Time Creatures
 The Dollmaker
 Dracula
 Dr. Cranium
 Dr. Droid
 Dr. Frankenstein
 Dr. Fright
 Dr. Gulliver
 The Earthors
 The Enforcer
 Giant Snow Creature
 The Highway Angels
 The Hydronoids
 The Ice Demon
 Insecta and the Arthropods
 The Iron Cyclops
 John Palette
 The Junk Creature from the Dump
 Kareem Azaar
 Keelhaul Kelly
 King Arthur
 The Lion Men
 The Make Up Monster
 Mal Havok
 The Man Beasts Of Xra
 The Marsh Monster
 Medula and her Mind Maidens
 Mongor
 The Mummy Of Nazca
 The Mysterious Mutants of the Space Sphere
 Nartan
 Ocina and the Ancient Atlantean Warriors
 Old Man Holmes
 Orville Gump (Otis in Superman)
 The Outlaws of Orion (Pack and Stardust)
 The Phantom Zone Villains (Hul, Logar, Rom-Lok)
 The Plant Creatures
 Professor Amy Zhan
 Professor Fearo
 Professor Korloff
 The Power Pirate
 The Robber Baron and Sleeves
 The Rock and Roll Space Bandits
 Rock Batman
 Rokan
 R.O.M.A.C.
 The Secret Four
 Scorpio
 Sculpin
 Sinbad and the Space Pirates
 Solderath and the Lava Men
 The Space Dolls
 The Evil Space Genie
 The Space Racers
 The Star Energy Creature
 The Super Enemies
 The Termites from Venus
 Torhana
 Tyrannic
 Vampiress, the Voodoo Vampire
 Yuna the Terrible
 Zarnum
 The Zoons
 Zycree (see General Zod)

Other DC Comics characters in Super Friends comics and merchandising related to the series
 Batgirl
 Black Canary
 Black Orchid
 Cyclotron
 Elongated Man
 Green Fury
 Global Guardians: Doctor Mist, Icemaiden, Little Mermaid, Seraph, Tasmanian Devil
 Golden Pharaoh
 Huntress
 Captain Marvel
 Mary Marvel
 Mr. Miracle
 Orion
 Red Tornado
 Supergirl

References to the Justice League of America name
Beginning with the original Super Friends season, the opening narration describes the team's headquarters as "the great hall of the Justice League". The opening credits of Challenge of the Superfriends names the Super Friends as the Justice League of America. In addition to the appearance of a JLA emblem on a communicator and a reference to a mission to repair the Justice League satellite, the Super Friends are often linked with the JLA. The Justice League satellite under repair is clearly the same design as the Justice League Satellite that appeared in the comics at the time, but was shown to be substantially smaller than its comic book counterpart.

Notable voice actors
The voice of the Narrator was provided by actor Ted Knight during the early hour-long episodes. Bill Woodson took over with the revival of the series in 1977. His signature line was "Meanwhile, back at the Hall of Justice...". The voices of Marvin and Wonder Dog as well as Mr. Mxyzptlk, Toyman, The Dollmaker, Darkseid, Kalibak, and The Joker were performed by Frank Welker. Adam West provided the voice of Batman in SuperFriends: The Legendary Super Powers Show and The Super Powers Team: Galactic Guardians. Casey Kasem provided the voice of Robin (and many others in the show). René Auberjonois lends his voice as DeSaad.

Reception
In January 2009, IGN listed Super Friends as the 50th best animated television series.

DVD releases

Spin-offs

Legends of the Superheroes

On January 18 and 25, 1979, Hanna-Barbera ran two one-hour live-action specials under the umbrella title Legends of the Superheroes. The first special, subtitled "The Challenge", was loosely based on the Super Friends and the 1960s Batman series (played for laughs, but this time, including a laugh track) and included several other DC characters who replaced Samurai, Black Vulcan, and Apache Chief: Black Canary, the E-2 Huntress Helena Wayne (a new DC character, gathering her own following in All-Star and Adventure Comics JSA runs as a JSA member), and Captain Marvel (who had previously had his own live action series through Filmation studios). The second special, entitled "The Roast", featured Ed McMahon as emcee of the roast, along the lines of The Dean Martin Celebrity Roast specials. Due to Warner Bros.' contracts on Wonder Woman (already being used in her own live action series; Lynda Carter) and Superman (in his own live-action theatrical movie at the time; Christopher Reeve), they were unable to be featured on the specials.

The Plastic Man Comedy Adventure Show

Plastic Man first appeared in the first season of Super Friends, in one episode. Later, Ruby-Spears Productions released a series starring the character in his own solo adventures.

Batman
A Batman animated series was also considered in the mid-1980s, presumably with Adam West reprising his role as the voice of Batman. "The Fear" was written as a pilot episode for the series, but it was instead adapted in to an episode of The Super Powers Team: Galactic Guardians.

The New Teen Titans
In 1983, a cartoon based upon The New Teen Titans comics began development. It was created as a companion for the Super Friends, to be set in the same continuity. Robin was not going to be featured in the cartoon though, at least not as a regular, since in the Super Friends universe, he was a member of the Justice League. Like Super Friends, the show was to be developed by Hanna-Barbera for ABC, but since shows like The Smurfs (airing on NBC) were so popular at the time, this show was never picked up by the network. The show would have featured Wonder Girl as the leader, along with Cyborg, Kid Flash, Changeling, Raven and Starfire. Although the show failed to get picked up, a television commercial with a substance abuse theme did feature the Titans, as they would have appeared in the animated series, along with a new superhero named "The Protector" who would have been the replacement character for Robin. A Teen Titans animated TV program was eventually produced, adding Robin and removing Wonder Girl, Kid Flash and The Protector.

DC Super Friends

Fisher-Price developed a toy line named DC Super Friends featuring DC Comics characters as toys for young children. A comic book series and direct-to-video original animation called The Joker's Playhouse (2010) was developed to tie-in. The video features the World's Greatest Super Friends theme, allusions to the Legion of Doom, and the Super Friends and their Hall of Justice.

Comic books

Super Friends
The first use of the Super Friends name on a DC Comics publication was in Limited Collectors' Edition #C-41 (December 1975-January 1976) which reprinted stories from Justice League of America #36 and 61 and featured a new framing sequence by writer E. Nelson Bridwell and artist Alex Toth. DC published a comic book version of the Super Friends from November 1976 to August 1981. The comic book series was launched by E. Nelson Bridwell and artist Ric Estrada. Zan and Jayna were given back stories and secret identities as a pair of blond-haired high school kids; they were more competent heroes than their cartoon counterparts.

While the television cartoons were not part of the same fictional universe as the DC comic books, writer E. Nelson Bridwell made the comic book accord with the other DC titles via footnotes. An example of trying to fit Super Friends into the DC Universe:
 Wendy, Marvin and Wonder Dog were the only ones active at the Hall of Justice, because the Justice League are in the 30th Century with the Justice Society (as shown in Justice League of America #147–148). Robin was busy helping the Titans in Teen Titans #50-52. Bridwell also gave them last names and ties to the other characters' histories; Wendy Harris was the niece of detective Harvey Harris (who helped train Batman) and Marvin White was the son of Diana Prince (the woman who helped provide Wonder Woman with a secret identity upon her arrival in America). While the show never explained the departure of Wendy, Marvin and Wonder Dog, the story was found in Super Friends #6–9.

The argument for the comic being part of the Earth-One continuity also included the fact that certain elements of the series impacted other books in the DC line:

1.  TNT's appearance in Kandor in an issue of Superman Family that references events exclusively from Super Friends issue #12

2.  Sinestro's lack of a power ring in an issue of The Brave and The Bold after the ring was destroyed in Super Friends issue #46.

3.  Superman already being familiar with Dr. Mist and the international heroes in DC Comics Presents after meeting them in Super Friends issues 7–9 and 12–13.

Because the Super Friends stories were referenced in and the events in them remembered by the characters in the core DC superhero titles - for example, in Justice League of America #155 (June 1978 - Red Tornado remembers using his powers to break the time barrier, which he did in Super Friends #8) - they have to be considered part of the Pre-Crisis Earth 1 ensemble of stories.

In 2008, DC began publishing a new Super Friends comic book starring Superman, Batman, Wonder Woman, Aquaman, Flash (Wally West) and Green Lantern (John Stewart). Based on the eponymous Imaginext toyline; it is aimed at children (being part of the Johnny DC imprint), with an art style reminiscent to that of Marvel's Super Hero Squad. Written by Sholly Fisch with art mainly from Dario Brizuela, Stewart McKenny and J. Bone (who was cover artist throughout the series), it ran for 29 issues, from May 2008 to September 2010.

Collected Editions
 Super Friends: For Justice! (collects #1-7)
 Super Friends: Calling All Super Friends (collects #8-14)
 Super Friends: Head of the Class (collects #15-21)
 Super Friends: Mystery In Space (collects #22-28)
 DC Goes Ape (576 pages, October 2008) collects #30
 DC Through the 80s: The End of Eras (520 pages, December 2020) collects #36
 Super Friends: Saturday Morning Comics
 Volume 1 (520 pages, June 2020) collects #1-26, Aquateers Meet the Super Friends, and the Super Friends stories from Limited Collector's Edition C-41 and C-46
 Volume 2 (488 pages, December 2020) collects #27-47

Extreme Justice
In the comics, the Wonder Twins were members of the short-lived JLI offshoot, Extreme Justice.

Young Justice
Young Justice was a comic series that followed the adventures of a group composed of the latest teen superheroes of the late 1990s and early 2000s, including Robin, Superboy, Impulse and Wonder Girl.  Towards the end of the run, Young Justice was involved in a mission which required them to invade an island whose population was made up of super-villains. To conduct a successful attack, the core team assembled all the then-known teen heroes (including the Wonder Twins).  As in Extreme Justice, neither spoke English and both seemed to enjoy eating CDs.  Unlike their cartoon counterparts, the Wonder Twins were rude and sarcastic.

Super Buddies

The lighthearted nature of the show was spoofed in the 2000s with two DC miniseries, Formerly Known as the Justice League and I Can't Believe It's Not the Justice League! (although these series were more direct take-offs on the 1980s Blue Beetle/Booster Gold-era Justice League). In these miniseries the group is known as the "Super Buddies", and consists of a team of ex-Justice League members. A television advertisement for the team shows them posing in the postures of the original Super Friends title card.

Teen Titans
As of issue #34 (2006), Wendy and Marvin were part of the DC continuity. They are now fraternal twins (a nod to their Super Friends successors, the Wonder Twins), engineering geniuses (having graduated from the Massachusetts Institute of Technology at age 16), and are employed at Titans Tower as maintenance crew and mechanical troubleshooters. They were responsible for restoring Titans member Cyborg to full functionality after he sustained damage to his artificial body parts during the events of the Infinite Crisis mini-series.  Wonder Dog was also introduced into the series, although (unlike the cartoon) he was not a lovable sidekick and pet, but a murderous, shape-shifting demon dog who was sent to Titans Tower to kill the team. Wonder Dog killed Marvin and attacked Wendy, leaving her crippled from the waist down.  Wendy is a supporting character in the Batgirl series, where she receives help accepting her disabilities from former Batgirl Barbara Gordon.

Justice League of America
During the events of the 2005 company-wide Infinite Crisis crossover the Justice League Watchtower was destroyed by Superboy-Prime, leaving the JLA without a base of operations. To that end, the team established the Hall of Justice in Washington, D.C. to act as an embassy for the team and an emergency base of operations if needed. In the continuity of the comics, the Hall was designed by Green Lantern and Wonder Woman. In Justice League of America #46 (2010) Samurai made his first appearance in the DC Universe, where he was shown as one of the heroes driven temporarily insane by Alan Scott.

Wizard magazine
Issue #77 of Wizard magazine parodied the Super Friends; the JLA was sent through a dimensional rift and met some of the Super Friends. After Martian Manhunter used his Martian vision to melt the villain and his machine (much to Green Lantern's dismay: "You have to trick him into leaving, or shutting off his machine, NOT direct physical violence!"), the Super Friends decided to send the Justice Leaguers back to their own dimension. As a jest, the magazine also ran an April Fool's promotion for a Wonder Twins special by painter Alex Ross. The book, entitled Wonder Twins: Form of Water, was to be one of Alex Ross' oversized books chronicling the Justice League. The plot would see Zan and Jayna using their powers to help the Earth's famine- and drought-stricken nations after their monkey, Gleek, contracted super-rabies from severe dehydration.

Superman and Batman: World's Funnest
In the Elseworlds one-shot Superman and Batman: World's Funnest, Bat-Mite and Mr. Mxyzptlk travel to different worlds within the DC Universe. On one of them, they encounter the Super Friends.

The Super Friends in other DC media

Superman: The Animated Series
In the Superman: The Animated Series two-part episode "Apokolips... Now!", Superman is fighting the Parademons in Metropolis. In the background is a building resembling the Hall of Justice, referred to in dialogue as "Metropolis Plaza". This was likely a reference to Darkseid's forces previously appearing in the final two seasons of Super Friends.

Justice League
At the end of "Secret Origins," the premiere three-episode arc of Justice League, Superman proposes the formation of a superhero coalition including himself, Batman, Wonder Woman, the Flash (Wally West), the Green Lantern (John Stewart), the Martian Manhunter, and Hawkgirl. In a direct reference (and perhaps a criticism of the somewhat silly name), the Flash jokingly asks if such a team would be called "Super Friends". Superman relabels the guild as the "Justice League".

Justice League Unlimited
In the animated series Justice League Unlimited, Gorilla Grodd reforms his Secret Society this time an even larger group of villains. While not called the Legion of Doom (due to DC executives disallowing the creative team from using the name), their headquarters is a craft similar to the Hall of Doom, located in a swamp. Additionally, the Justice League's Metro Tower headquarters in Metropolis strongly resembled the Hall of Justice.

The Ultimen, loosely based on characters created for the Super Friends, appear in the episode "Ultimatum", as allies and later antagonists to the League. The Ultimen consisted of Long Shadow (based on Apache Chief and voiced by Gregg Rainwater), Juice (based on Black Vulcan and voiced by an uncredited CCH Pounder in a digitally-altered voice), Wind Dragon (based on Samurai and voiced by James Sie), and Downpour and Shifter (based on the Wonder Twins and voiced by Grey DeLisle). They are a group of superheroes created by Project Cadmus to be loyal to the government, with Maxwell Lord as their manager. Additionally, they are genetically unstable and have short lifespans, being continuously cloned and implanted with false memories.

The Batman
The animated series The Batman featured a modified version of the JLA Watchtower which closely resembled the Hall of Justice.

Batman: The Brave and the Bold
The Hall of Justice appeared in the Batman: The Brave and the Bold episode "Sidekicks Assemble!", with a pastiche of the music played when the Hall appeared in Super Friends.

Smallville
The Wonder Twins appeared in the Smallville episode "Idol", with Zan played by David Gallagher and Jayna played by Allison Scagliotti. Gleek did not appear physically, but a cartoonish image of him was shown on each of the twins' cellphones.

Young Justice
The Hall of Justice was featured in Young Justice as the Justice League's decoy base of operations. Additionally, Wendy and Marvin appear as classmates of Conner Kent and Megan Morse. The members of the Injustice League operate out of a base resembling the Legion's Hall of Doom.

In the second season, approximations of the minority members created for Super Friends (similar to the Ultimen example above) are introduced as teenagers given powers by the Reach. The group consists of Tye Longshadow (Apache Chief), Asami "Sam" Koizumi (Samurai) and Eduardo "Ed" Dorado Jr. (El Dorado). The exception is Black Vulcan, whose place is taken by Milestone Media hero Static (though Black Lightning also appears in the series).

DC Nation Shorts
The title of the Super Best Friends Forever DC Nation Shorts is a play on the title Super Friends. Additionally, Black Vulcan's costume can be seen in the background of the first Black Lightning short. The Farm League carries several homages to the Super Friends including its narrator, characters used and graphics.

Teen Titans Go! 
In the Teen Titans Go! Two-Parter episode, the Titans go to the Hall of Justice to use the pool, as later, they become members of the Justice League to save the Justice League members from Darkseid, this sequence parodies the introduction of the super heroes as in the Super Friends series.

In the episode "You're Fired", Beast Boy is fired from the Teen Titans, and a competition is held to find his replacement.  The eventual winners are the Wonder Twins.

Arrowverse
The shows set in The CW's Arrowverse have featured multiple references to the Super Friends.

In the pilot episode of Supergirl, Winn Schott considers calling the group of Supergirl/Kara Zor-El and her allies (himself, James Olsen, and Alex Danvers) "The Super Friends". In the fourth season episode, "What's So Funny About Truth, Justice And The American Way?", Kara forms a small team of heroes that includes herself, Brainiac 5, The Dreamer, and the Martian Manhunter and directly calls them "The Super Friends". In the fifth-season episode, "Back From the Future - Part One", the S.T.A.R. Labs base (see below) is noted to be called the Hall of Justice in the future.

In the "Invasion" cross-over event, across Supergirl, The Flash, Arrow and DC's Legends of Tomorrow, the secret STAR Labs base used by the heroes was based on the Hall of Justice. Also later on in that season, Barry and Supergirl sing a duet called "Super Friends" to escape the Music Meister's musical.

Season 2 of Legends of Tomorrow features multiple references to Super Friends, including the villainous group being dubbed the "Legion of Doom" by Nate Heywood; in the episode "Doomworld", the new design of S.T.A.R. Labs in the altered timeline resembles the Hall of Doom. In the final scene of Crisis on Infinite Earths, Barry repurposed the secret S.T.A.R. Labs base previously used in "Invasion!" as the headquarters for Earth-Prime's heroes. In the closing moments of the crossover, the unnamed team is disrupted by the confusing sound of laughter (revealed to be an escaped Gleek, hinting at a possible future inclusion of the character and/or Wonder Twins). Afterwards, the camera pans out to the headquarters as music based on the original series plays in the background.

The Lego Batman Movie
In The Lego Batman Movie, the cast of the Super Friends are seen celebrating an anniversary party in the Fortress of Solitude, which Batman was not invited to, featuring characters like El Dorado, The Wonder Twins, Gleek and Wonder Dog.

Video games

Injustice: Gods Among Us
The Hall of Justice is a playable stage in Injustice: Gods Among Us.

Lego Batman 3: Beyond Gotham
In Lego Batman 3: Beyond Gotham, the Hall of Justice is one of the game's hubs, while the Hall of Doom and the surrounding swamp environs are explorable areas.

Toys

Super Powers Collection

The Super Powers toy line (and associated tie-in merchandise) was based on the final two seasons of Super Friends. Samurai, an original character from the show, and the Hall of Justice were both released. Plans for future waves from Super Powers would have also included Apache Chief, El Dorado, Black Vulcan and the Wonder Twins.

Justice League Unlimited

The toy line based on Justice League Unlimited released a three pack of figures from characters created for Super Friends, namely Black Vulcan, Apache Chief and Samurai. They were chosen over the Ultimen characters that actually appeared in the JLU animated series: Juice, Long Shadow and Wind Dragon.

DC Super Friends
Fisher-Price began to produce DC Comics characters in a kid-friendly toyline named after the Super Friends.

DC Universe Classics

Paying homage to Super Powers, DC Universe Classics produced original Super Friends characters such as Apache Chief, Black Vulcan, El Dorado, Samurai and the Wonder Twins.

References

External links
 
 Will's Ultimate Super Friends Episode Guide!
 Super Friends @ BatmanYTB.com
 Super Friends at Pazsaz.com
 Super Friends at Legions of Gotham

 
1973 American television series debuts
1986 American television series endings
1970s American animated television series
1980s American animated television series
1970s American science fiction television series
1980s American science fiction television series
American Broadcasting Company original programming
Animated Batman television series
Animated Superman television series
Wonder Woman in other media
DC Comics superhero teams
DC Comics titles
Hanna-Barbera superheroes
1976 comics debuts
Toonami
Animated Justice League television series
American children's animated action television series
American children's animated adventure television series
American children's animated science fantasy television series
American children's animated superhero television series
English-language television shows
Animated television series about robots
Television series by Warner Bros. Television Studios